Germain Green Glidden (December 5, 1913 – February 11, 1999) was an American national squash champion, painter, muralist, cartoonist and founder of the National Art Museum of Sport.

Life and career
Glidden was born in Binghamton, New York, raised in Englewood, New Jersey and attended both Phillips Exeter Academy and Harvard University. After graduating, he studied at Art Students League of New York and the Metropolitan Museum of Art and when World War II erupted, he joined U.S. Navy as a naval officer, stationed in Hawaii. Following the war, Glidden became a portrait artist. His works were and still are displayed at various national museums, including; the National Churchill Library and Center, the Fogg Museum and national halls of fame of baseball, basketball and tennis. The Portraits of Ronald Reagan and George H. W. Bush that he painted during his lifetime were later commissioned to be included into the National Art Museum of Sport, of which he was a founder.

During his years as a squash player, Glidden had won the Metropolitan Doubles in 1947 (with John J. Smith) as well as many national titles in intercollegiates (1935-1936), singles (1936-1938) doubles (1952) and veterans (1953 and 1955–1956), retiring undefeated. He died at the age of 85 in Norwalk Hospital, while residing in Silvermine, Connecticut and was buried at the Worthington Center Cemetery.

References

1913 births
1999 deaths
American male squash players
American cartoonists
United States Navy personnel of World War II
20th-century American painters
Phillips Exeter Academy alumni
Harvard University alumni
People from Binghamton, New York
People from Englewood, New Jersey
Sportspeople from Bergen County, New Jersey
American male tennis players
Tennis people from New Jersey